Northern Caribbean University (NCU) is a private, liberal-arts institution owned and operated by the Jamaica Union Conference (JAMU) and the Atlantic Caribbean Union Mission (ACUM) of Seventh-day Adventists, and is located in Jamaica. With its main campus only 2 miles south of Mandeville town, in Manchester, and three other campuses situated in Kingston, Montego Bay and Salem Runaway Bay, St. Ann, the university offers a number of professional, pre-professional and vocational programmes in a spiritually wholesome and aesthetically pleasing atmosphere. Established in 1907, NCU currently enjoys an average yearly enrollment of over five thousand students, from up to 35 countries.

It is a part of the Seventh-day Adventist education system, the world's second largest Christian school system.
and is the world’s largest English speaking Seventh-day Adventist tertiary institution.

History

Northern Caribbean University is the oldest private tertiary institution in Jamaica, and was first known as West Indian Training School. It began with 8 students in 1907, as an institution offering courses only up to the twelfth grade. Following a temporary closure in 1913 it resumed operations in 1919. In 1936 it was renamed West Indian Training College. As its offerings developed to include theology, teacher education, secretarial science, business, and natural sciences, it became a junior college. It achieved senior college status in the late 1950s when it began to offer the bachelor's degree in Theology and was renamed West Indies College in 1959. Since then, baccalaureate programmes in some twenty other disciplines have been added. In 1999 the college was granted university status by the Jamaican Government, and was renamed Northern Caribbean University. Currently the university offers graduate and post-graduate programs in the sciences, religion, business and education.

Hyacinth Chen Nursing School
The Hyacinth Chen School of Nursing was officially opened on the 10th of August 2008 on a location directly across from the Northern Caribbean University campus across from NCU's Dental Centre located in Mandeville, Jamaica.

The school is owned by the Seventh-day Adventist Church in Jamaica. The school is being named in honour of Mrs. Hyacinth Chen, the mother of major donor, Michael Lee-Chin, Jamaican/Canadian businessman.

The school will hold 800 nursing students and will reduce Jamaica's nursing shortage.

Awards
The university gained global exposure in the Microsoft Imagine Cup competition of 2007 where members of the school's Computer and Information Sciences department competing as Team ICAD took 3rd place.

NCU was crowned regional champions in 2005, 2007, and 2009. In 2007, NCU Imagine Cup Team ICAD represented Jamaica and the region at the world finals in South Korea where it outclassed competitors from across the globe to place 3rd in the world.

Research
The university hosts a local research centre of the Ellen G. White Estate.

Historic buildings
Several buildings on the NCU site have been declared as National Historic Sites by the Jamaica National Heritage Trust, including Rose Cottage and the school's chapel.

Notable alumni
 Stennett H. Brooks, president of the Northeastern Conference of Seventh-Day Adventist Churches
 Patrece Charles-Freeman, Jamaican public health expert
 Robert Miller, Jamaican member of parliament

See also

 List of Seventh-day Adventist colleges and universities
 Seventh-day Adventist education

References

External links
 Northern Caribbean University official website
 Aerial view

Universities in Jamaica
Universities and colleges affiliated with the Seventh-day Adventist Church
Ellen G. White Estate
Educational institutions established in 1907
1907 establishments in Jamaica
Buildings and structures in Manchester Parish